The Elizabeth Ducey House is a house located in northwest Portland, Oregon, listed on the National Register of Historic Places.

See also
 National Register of Historic Places listings in Northwest Portland, Oregon

References

1927 establishments in Oregon
Hillside, Portland, Oregon
Houses completed in 1927
Houses on the National Register of Historic Places in Portland, Oregon
Portland Historic Landmarks